Luis Alberto Rico Samaniego (born 9 November 1938) is a Mexican engineer and politician affiliated with the National Action Party. As of 2014 he served as Senator of the LVIII and LIX Legislatures of the Mexican Congress representing Coahuila and as Deputy during the LVI Legislature.

References

1938 births
Living people
Politicians from Mexico City
Members of the Senate of the Republic (Mexico)
Members of the Chamber of Deputies (Mexico)
National Action Party (Mexico) politicians
20th-century Mexican politicians
21st-century Mexican politicians
Monterrey Institute of Technology and Higher Education alumni
Autonomous University of Nuevo León alumni
Mexican mechanical engineers